Shri Vaijnath Temple (Marathi श्री वैजनाथ मंदिर ) is an ancient Shiva temple  located at Parli Vaijnath in Beed district of Maharashtra, India. It one of the 12 Jyotirlingas. It is assumed that the temple is about 3000 years old.

Vaijanath Temple is built out of stone on a small hill and is surrounded by a wall that protects it from all sides. Two very popular legends are associated with this temple. One of the legends talks about the Amrit and the other talks about the demon King Ravana and his quest to own Shiva.

Architecture
The temple is built on a hill using stones. Temple is approximately at a height of 75-80 feet from ground level. The main entrance is from the east and the magnificent door present there is brass plated. Surrounded by four strong walls, the temple consists of corridors and a courtyard. The main gate of the temple also called "Mahadwar" has a Minaret nearby called a Prachi or Gawaksha, i.e., window. The temple has a wide staircase to enter. The temple renovated by Shiva devotee Ahalyadevi Holkar in the year 1706.

Culture
In addition to the traditional Maharashtrian way of life, though Parli Vaijnath is a place of pilgrimage for Shiva devotees, it is also a meeting point for Hari Hara. Lord Krishna's festivals too are celebrated along with Lord Shankara's festivals, with great festivity. Festivals of both Krishna and Shiva are celebrated here, as per the Indian Lunar Calendar.

Darshan

While performing Abhishekam, male devotees are not allowed to wear clothes above the waist.

References

External links  
Shree Vaijnath Temple at Beed Government web

 

Jyotirlingas
Hindu temples in Maharashtra
Tourist attractions in Beed district